Aporostylis is a genus of flowering plants from the orchid family, Orchidaceae. At the present time, only one species is known: Aporostylis bifolia, native to New Zealand (including the Chatham Islands and the  Antipodes Islands).

See also 
 List of Orchidaceae genera

References 

 Pridgeon, A.M., Cribb, P.J., Chase, M.A. & Rasmussen, F. eds. (1999). Genera Orchidacearum 1. Oxford Univ. Press.
 Pridgeon, A.M., Cribb, P.J., Chase, M.A. & Rasmussen, F. eds. (2001). Genera Orchidacearum 2. Oxford Univ. Press.
 Pridgeon, A.M., Cribb, P.J., Chase, M.A. & Rasmussen, F. eds. (2003). Genera Orchidacearum 3. Oxford Univ. Press
 Berg Pana, H. 2005. Handbuch der Orchideen-Namen. Dictionary of Orchid Names. Dizionario dei nomi delle orchidee. Ulmer, Stuttgart

External links 

Diurideae genera
Caladeniinae
Orchids of New Zealand
Flora of the Chatham Islands
Flora of the Antipodes Islands
Monotypic Orchidoideae genera